Katharine Pooley is a British interior designer. She owns a high-end homewares boutique in London.

Pooley was raised in Scotland. Her father, Robert, served in the RAF. He bought Forter Castle in Perthshire in 1990, which Pooley still owns. Pooley attended school at Oxford and went to university in France before working for Morgan Stanley for 16 years. While working for Morgan Stanley in Singapore, she met her husband Dan, who is a professional tennis player and property developer. They have two sons.

Pooley opened a home accessories store in 2004 on Walton Street in Chelsea, London, a design studio the following year, and a showroom in Doha in 2012.

References

Living people
English interior designers
Year of birth missing (living people)